The following are international rankings of .

Economy

World Economic Forum 2019 Global Competitiveness Report  ranked 126 out of 141 economies

Geography

At , Ethiopia is the world's 27th-largest country. It is bordered by Eritrea to the north and northeast, Djibouti and Somalia to the east, Sudan and South Sudan to the west, and Kenya to the south.

Military

Institute for Economics and Peace: Global Peace Index 2009, ranked 128 out of 144

Politics

Transparency International 2019 Corruption Perceptions Index, ranked 96 out of 179
Reporters Without Borders 2020 Press Freedom Index, ranked 99 out of 180 countries
World Justice Project Rule of Law Index 2019, ranked 118 out of 126 countries

Society

United Nations Development Programme 2019 Human Development Index ranked 173 out of 189 countries
 Homicide rate  ranked 5 out of 230 territories

References

See also
International rankings of Eritrea 

Ethiopia
Communications in Ethiopia
Demographics of Ethiopia
Economy of Ethiopia
Education in Ethiopia
Environment of Ethiopia
Foreign relations of Ethiopia
Geography of Ethiopia
Military of Ethiopia
Politics of Ethiopia